Gammelgården is a locality situated in Kalix Municipality, Norrbotten County, Sweden with 297 inhabitants in 2010.

References 

Populated places in Kalix Municipality
Norrbotten